Soyuz TMA-15 was a crewed spaceflight to the International Space Station. Part of the Soyuz programme, it transported three members of the Expedition 20 crew to the space station. TMA-15 was the 102nd crewed flight of a Soyuz spacecraft, since Soyuz 1 in 1967. The Soyuz spacecraft remained docked to the space station during Expedition 20 and Expedition 21 as an emergency escape vehicle. The mission marked the start of six-person crew operations on the ISS.

Crew

Backup crew

Mission highlights

Soyuz TMA-15 was launched successfully by a Soyuz-FG carrier rocket from Site 1/5 at the Baikonur Cosmodrome in Kazakhstan, at 10:34 UTC on 27 May 2009. It docked with the ISS at 12:34 UTC on 29 May 2009.

Roman Romanenko was the third second-generation space traveller. He was reported to have chosen Taymyr as the mission callsign because it was the callsign on his father's first flight, Soyuz 26; however, the callsign Parus ( meaning Sail) was used for communications with the spacecraft. Robert Thirsk became the first Canadian to fly on a Soyuz; all previous Canadians in space had flown aboard Space Shuttles. Frank De Winne became the first European to be in command of the ISS.

The craft and crew returned to earth 1 December 2009.

References

Crewed Soyuz missions
Spacecraft launched in 2009
Spacecraft which reentered in 2009
Spacecraft launched by Soyuz-FG rockets